Kernicterus is a bilirubin-induced brain dysfunction. The term was coined in 1904 by Christian Georg Schmorl.  Bilirubin is a naturally occurring substance in the body of humans and many other animals, but it is neurotoxic when its concentration in the blood is too high, a condition known as hyperbilirubinemia. Hyperbilirubinemia may cause bilirubin to accumulate in the grey matter of the central nervous system, potentially causing irreversible neurological damage. Depending on the level of exposure, the effects range from clinically unnoticeable to severe brain damage and even death.

When hyperbilirubinemia increases past a mild level, it leads to jaundice, raising the risk of progressing to kernicterus. When this happens in adults, it is usually because of liver problems.  Newborns are especially vulnerable to hyperbilirubinemia-induced neurological damage, because in the earliest days of life, the still-developing liver is heavily exercised by the breakdown of fetal hemoglobin as it is replaced with adult hemoglobin and the blood–brain barrier is not as developed. Mildly elevated serum bilirubin levels are common in newborns, and neonatal jaundice is not unusual, but bilirubin levels must be carefully monitored in case they start to climb, in which case more aggressive therapy is needed, usually via light therapy but sometimes even via exchange transfusion.

Classification

Acute bilirubin encephalopathy (ABE)
ABE is an acute state of elevated bilirubin in the central nervous system. Clinically, it encompasses a wide range of symptoms. These include lethargy, decreased feeding, hypotonia or hypertonia, a high-pitched cry, spasmodic torticollis, opisthotonus, setting sun sign, fever, seizures, and even death. If the bilirubin is not rapidly reduced, ABE quickly progresses to chronic bilirubin encephalopathy.

Chronic bilirubin encephalopathy (CBE)
CBE is a chronic state of severe bilirubin-induced neurological lesions. Reduction of bilirubin in this state will not reverse the sequelae. Clinically, manifestations of CBE include: 
 movement disorders – dyskinetic CP with often spasticity.  60% have severe motor disability (unable to walk).
 auditory dysfunction – auditory neuropathy (ANSD)
 visual/oculomotor impairments (nystagmus, strabismus, impaired upward or downward gaze, and/or cortical visual impairment). In rare cases, decreased visual acuity(blindness) can occur.
 dental enamel hypoplasia/dysplasia of the deciduous teeth,
 gastroesophageal reflux,
 impaired digestive function.
 slightly decreased intellectual function: Although most individuals (approximately 85%) with kernicterus fall in normal or dull-normal range.
 epilepsy is uncommon.
These impairments are associated with lesions in the basal ganglia, auditory nuclei of the brain stem, and oculomotor nuclei of the brain stem. Cortex and white matter are subtly involved. Cerebellum may be involved. Severe cortical involvement is uncommon.

Subtle bilirubin encephalopathy (SBE)
SBE is a chronic state of mild bilirubin-induced neurological dysfunction (BIND). Clinically, this may result in neurological, learning and movement disorders, isolated hearing loss and auditory dysfunction.
 In the past it was thought that kernicterus (KI) often cause an intellectual disability.  This was assumed due to difficulty with hearing, that is typically not detected in a normal audiogram accompanied by impairments of speech, with choreoathetosis. With advances in technology, this has proven to not be the case as those living with KI have repeatedly demonstrated their intelligence using Augmentative Communication devices . Although most individuals with kernicteric cerebral palsy have normal intelligence, some children with mild choreoathetosis develop dull normal intelligence or mild intellectual disability even without auditory dysfunction.

Causes
In the vast majority of cases, kernicterus is associated with unconjugated hyperbilirubinemia during the neonatal period. The blood–brain barrier is not fully functional in neonates and therefore bilirubin is able to cross into the central nervous system. Moreover, neonates have much higher levels of bilirubin in their blood due to:
 Rapid breakdown of fetal red blood cells immediately prior to birth, with subsequent replacement by normal adult human red blood cells. This breakdown of fetal red blood cells releases large amounts of bilirubin.
 Severe hemolytic disease of the newborn. Many children who survive exhibit permanent mental impairment or damage to motor areas of the brain because of precipitation of bilirubin in neurons.
 Neonates have a limited ability to metabolize and excrete bilirubin. The sole pathway for bilirubin elimination is through the uridine diphosphate glucuronosyltransferase isoform 1A1 (UGT1A1) enzyme, which performs a reaction called "glucuronidation". This reaction adds a large sugar to the bilirubin, which makes the compound more water-soluble, so it can be more readily excreted via the urine and/or the feces. The UGT1A1 enzyme is not active in appreciable amounts until several months after birth. Apparently, this is a developmental compromise since the maternal liver and placenta perform glucuronidation for the fetus.
 Administration of aspirin to neonates and infants. Aspirin displaces bilirubin from serum albumin, thus generating an increased level of free bilirubin which can cross the developing blood brain barrier. This can be life-threatening.

Bilirubin is known to accumulate in the gray matter of neurological tissue where it exerts direct neurotoxic effects. It appears that its neurotoxicity is due to mass-destruction of neurons by apoptosis and necrosis.

Risk factors
 Premature birth
 Rh incompatibility
 Polycythemia – often present in neonates
 Sulfonamides (e.g. co-trimoxazole) – displaces bilirubin from serum albumin
 Crigler–Najjar syndrome, type I
 G6PD deficiency
 Bruising
Gilbert's syndrome and G6PD deficiency occurring together especially increases the risk for kernicterus.

Diagnosis
In neonates with kernicterus, the Moro reflex may be absent or symmetrically reduced.

Prevention
Measuring the serum bilirubin is helpful in evaluating a baby's risk for developing kernicterus. These numbers can then be plotted on the Bhutani nomogram. In neonates with hyperbilirubinemia, light therapy may be effective in reducing the serum bilirubin level. More severe cases may require the use of exchange transfusion.

Treatment
Currently no effective treatment exists for kernicterus. Future therapies may include neuroregeneration.  A handful of patients have undergone deep brain stimulation, and experienced some benefit. Drugs such as baclofen, clonazepam, gabapentin, and artane are often used to manage movement disorders associated with kernicterus.  Proton pump inhibitors are also used to help with reflux.  Cochlear implants and hearing aids have also been known to improve the hearing loss that can come with kernicterus (auditory neuropathy – ANSD).

Notable people 
 Claudio Tiribelli, Italian hepatologist, studies on Kernicterus

References

External links 

Neurological disorders
Haemorrhagic and haematological disorders of fetus and newborn
Cerebral palsy and other paralytic syndromes
Neonatology
Rare diseases